Brian Webb (1935–1981) was a railway historian and author of several books on British railways, published through the 1970s. He specialised in some of the less prominent aspects of the railways, such as industrial railways and diesel locomotives.

For 15 years, until his death, he worked with his partner and copy typist, Sandra J.C. Tassell.

He died suddenly, in 1981, immediately before publication of his book on the Deltic. His last book, on the diesel locomotives of Armstrong Whitworth, was completed in manuscript in 1979, however it was not finally published for another thirty years.

Publications

References 

Rail transport writers
1930s births
1981 deaths